Inuromaesa sogdiana is a species of tephritid, or fruit flies, in the genus Inuromaesa of the family Tephritidae.

References

Tephritinae